Amalija Belaj-Arbeiter (born 25 June 1939) is a Slovenian former cross-country skier. She competed in the women's 10 kilometres and the women's 3 × 5 kilometre relay events at the 1956 Winter Olympics, representing Yugoslavia.

References

External links
 

1939 births
Living people
Slovenian female cross-country skiers
Olympic cross-country skiers of Yugoslavia
Cross-country skiers at the 1956 Winter Olympics
Sportspeople from Celje